Sir John Osborne, 7th Baronet (died 11 April 1743), was an Irish baronet, landowner and politician.

Biography
He was the younger son of Nicholas Osborne (died 25 December 1714) and wife Anne née Parsons, and grandson of Sir Thomas Osborne, 5th Baronet and Sir Laurence Parsons, 1st Baronet. He succeeded his brother, Sir Nicholas Osborne, 6th Baronet, in 1719.

Educated at the Middle Temple, he practised as a barrister after being called to the Bar at King's Inns, Dublin in 1726.

Sir John served as member of Parliament in the Irish House of Commons for Lismore from 1719 until 1727 and for Waterford County between 1727 and 1743.

Marriage
Osborne married Editha Proby (died 19 January 1745), daughter of William Proby of Fort St George in India.

Sir John and Lady Osborne had five surviving daughters and one surviving son, Rt. Hon. Sir William Osborne, 8th Baronet, who succeeded his father in the baronetcy in 1743.

Sources
 L. G. Pine, The New Extinct Peerage 1884–1971: Containing Extinct, Abeyant, Dormant and Suspended Peerages With Genealogies and Arms (London, U.K.: Heraldry Today, 1972), page 60.
 Charles Mosley, editor, Burke's Peerage, Baronetage & Knightage, 107th edition, 3 volumes (Wilmington, Delaware, U.S.A.: Burke's Peerage (Genealogical Books) Ltd, 2003), volume 2, page 3031.

References

External links
 www.thepeerage.com

1688 births
Members of the Middle Temple
Members of the King's Inns
Irish MPs 1715–1727
Irish MPs 1727–1760
1743 deaths
Osborne baronets
Members of the Parliament of Ireland (pre-1801) for County Waterford constituencies